The 1970 United States Senate election in New Mexico took place on November 3, 1970. Incumbent Democratic U.S. Senator Joseph Montoya successfully ran for re-election to a second term, defeating Republican Anderson Carter.

Democratic primary

Candidates 
Joseph Montoya, incumbent U.S. Senator
Richard B. Edwards

Results

Republican primary

Candidates 
Anderson Carter
David Cargo, Governor of New Mexico
Harold G. Thompson

Results

General election

Results

See also 
 United States Senate elections, 1970

References 

New Mexico
1970
United States Senate